Posture corrector, also known as postural corrector, is a device that leads to awareness of the current posture. They can be in form of braces, as well as restrictive clothing, with other types of gadgets also available on the market. Modern devices may include some electronics, as well as gyroscopes and magnets too. They have been on the market for 30 years. The scientific evidence for effectiveness of postural correctors is limited, and possibly even biased, since some postural corrector manufacturers fund the research. It is known that some devices can even do harm to the user. And there is little evidence linking the back pain with slouching or bad posture. Also, determining what type of postural corrector to use for specific case is important.

References

Posture